Lysette Anne Chodzko (born 26 September 1963), known professionally as Lysette Anthony, is an English actress and model. She is known for her roles in the film Husbands and Wives (1992), as Princess Lysssa in the 1983 fantasy epic Krull, the first season of the ITV comedy-drama series Auf Wiedersehen, Pet (1983), the BBC1 sitcom Three Up, Two Down (1985-1989) and her role as Marnie Nightingale in the Channel 4 soap opera Hollyoaks (2016–2022).

Early life
Anthony was born on 26 September 1963 in Marylebone, London, the only child of actor Michael Adam Anthony (né Chodzko), an actor from Jersey, and actress Bernadette Milnes. The couple later divorced. Anthony's French-born paternal grandfather, Alexander Victor Chodzko, was a mariner and journalist of Polish descent.

Anthony's childhood was made difficult by her mother's manic depression and schizophrenia and she left home at 19. In 1980, at age 16, Anthony was heralded as the "Face of the Eighties" by photographer David Bailey. She was a successful model before she became known as an actress at the age of 20. During the decade, she appeared in numerous music videos for artists such as Bryan Adams ("Summer of '69", "Somebody", "Heaven", and "Run to You") and Depeche Mode ("I Feel You").

Acting career

Stage
Anthony made her first stage appearance at the Cambridge Theatre at age 10. Four years later, she performed with the National Youth Theatre. She appeared at the Trafalgar Studios in the West End as Arabella Lucretia in the television comedy The New Statesman, with Rik Mayall. She has played the role of Joanna Lyppiatt in Noël Coward's Present Laughter (with Simon Callow) and the role of Eleanor in Terry Johnson's Dead Funny at the West Yorkshire Playhouse.

Television
Anthony's credits include a non-speaking role in British Telecom adverts, ITV's Murder in Suburbia, Agatha Christie's Poirot, a regular role in the soap opera Night & Day (ITV), Hotel! for Channel 5, BBC's Jonathan Creek, Oliver Twist, Dombey and Son, A Ghost in Monte Carlo, Campion episode "Sweet Danger" (as Lady Amanda Fitton), Lovejoy, Hollyoaks and ITV’s Auf Wiedersehen, Pet. She also starred for four years in the BBC sitcom Three Up, Two Down. She also portrayed Angelique Bouchard for eight episodes of the prime time revival of the gothic soap opera Dark Shadows. She also played Miss Clarise Mimsers in The Dead Man's Gun in 1998 as well as Miss Scarlett in the third series of Cluedo on ITV in 1992.

Her television appearances in 2006 included roles in Casualty and a new sitcom pilot, Baggy Trousers. She also played the roles of Rachel Heath, a semi-regular character in The Bill and Veronica Cray in The Hollow, a two-part Poirot film for ITV. She also appeared briefly in Coronation Street on 13 August 2010 and as an American patient in Holby City in February 2013. In 2014, she appeared on an episode of Pointless Celebrities partnered with Christopher Timothy. She also played the role as Lady Rowena in Ivanhoe in 1982.

In February 2016, Anthony began appearing in the Channel 4 soap opera Hollyoaks as Marnie Nightingale. Her character was killed off in January 2022 after collapsing due to a brain injury caused by an explosion, ending Anthony's almost six-year-long run with the soap. In October 2022, she appeared in three episodes of the BBC soap opera Doctors as Mary Dougan.

Audio
In 2008, Anthony portrayed Clara Harris in the Doctor Who audio adventure Assassin in the Limelight. In February 2010, it was announced that she would be returning to the world of Dark Shadows starring in the audio drama Kingdom of the Dead.

Personal life
Anthony married Dutch artist and entrepreneur Luc Leestemaker in 1990; they divorced in 1995 after Anthony left Leestemaker for married American film director David Price whom she met while filming Dr. Jekyll and Ms. Hyde. She went on to marry Price and they were together for two years until they divorced. Anthony was in a relationship with composer Simon Boswell from 2004 to 2010, with whom she has a son called Jimi. In 2008, her son was diagnosed with juvenile arthritis. She now raises funds for research.

In The Sunday Times on 15 October 2017, Anthony made public allegations that Harvey Weinstein raped her in the late 1980s.

Selected credits

Film
 Krull (1983) as Lyssa
 Night Train to Murder (1984) as Kathy Chalmers
 Zoeken naar Eileen (1987) as Marian Faber; Eileen W.
 The Emperor's New Clothes (1987) as Princess Gilda
 Without a Clue (1988) as Leslie Giles
 Switch (1991) as Liz
 Husbands and Wives (1992) as Sam
 The Pleasure Principle (1992) as Charlotte D'Bonne
 Look Who's Talking Now (1993) as Samantha D'Bonne
 The Hour of the Pig (1993) as Filette d'Auferre
 Save Me (1994) as Ellie
 The Hard Truth (1994) as Lisa Kantrell
 Dracula: Dead and Loving It (1995) as Lucy Westenra
 Dr. Jekyll and Ms. Hyde (1995) as Sarah Carver
 Robinson Crusoe (1997) as Mrs. Crusoe
 Misbegotten (1998) as Caitlan Bourke
 Tale of the Mummy (1999) as Dr. Claire Mulrooney
 Farewell to Harry (2002) as Louie Sinclair
 Stripper vs Werewolves (2012) as Basildon Cinemagoer

Television
 Ivanhoe (1982) as Lady Rowena
 Dombey and Son (1983) as Florence Dombey
 Jemima Shore Investigates (1983) as Meriel Harper
 Princess Daisy (1983) as Lady Sarah
 Auf Wiedersehen Pet (1983) as Christa
 Oliver Twist (1985) as Rose Maylie
 Three Up, Two Down (1985–1989) as Angie Tyler (née Trenchard)
 Lovejoy (1986) (Season 1, episode 8, "The March Of Time") as Sophy Fairfax
 Jack the Ripper (1988) as Mary Jane Kelly
 The Lady and the Highwayman (1989) as Lady Panthea Vyne 
 A Ghost in Monte Carlo (1990) as Mistral 
 Campion (1990) (Season 2, episode 1, "Sweet Danger") as Amanda Fitton
 Dark Shadows (1991) as Angélique Bouchard
 Tales from the Crypt (1993) (Season 5, episode 3, Forever Ambergris) as Bobbi
 Trilogy of Terror II (1996) as Laura, Bobby's Mom / Dr. Simpson
 Jonathan Creek (1999) (Season 3, episode 4, "Ghosts Forge") as Mimi Tranter 
 The Bill (2003–2004) as Rachel Heath
 Agatha Christie's Poirot (2004), Nr. 53 (Season 9, episode 4, "The Hollow") as Veronica Cray
 Casualty (2007, 2009) as Rachel Houston; Amanda
 Doctors (2007, 2010, 2012, 2015, 2022) as Joanne Oaksey; Marcelle D'Arby; Patricia Montana; Anna Ashton; Mary Dougan
 Hollyoaks (2008–2009) as Yvonne Summers
 Coronation Street (2010) as Lydia Radcliffe
 Holby City (2013) as Shelley Pinches
 We Still Kill the Old Way (2014) as Lizzie Davis
 Hollyoaks (2016–2022) as Marnie Nightingale (series regular; 444 episodes)

Stage
 The Vagina Monologues at the Royal Albert Hall
 Jackie (as Jackie Bouvier Kennedy Onassis in the play's transfer from Broadway) at the Queen's Theatre
 Toys in the Attic at Watford with Hayley Mills
 Restoration at the Bristol Old Vic
 The Lady's Not for Burning at the Northcott Theatre, Exeter
 Ghosts (by Ibsen)
 The New Statesman with Rik Mayall
 Hay Fever by Noël Coward. Directed by Greg Hersov at the Royal Exchange, Manchester
 Lady Windermere's Fan at the Royal Exchange, Manchester
 84 Charing Cross Road at the Salisbury Playhouse

References

External links
 
 Lysette Anthony(Aveleyman)

1963 births
Living people
20th-century English actresses
21st-century English actresses
Actresses from London
English film actresses
English people of French descent
English people of Polish descent
English soap opera actresses
English stage actresses
English television actresses
National Youth Theatre members
People from Marylebone